The UCSF Industry Documents Library (IDL) is a digital archive of internal tobacco, drug, food, chemical and fossil fuel corporate documents, acquired largely through litigation, which illustrate industry efforts to influence policies and regulations meant to protect public health.  Created and maintained by the UCSF Library, the mission of the UCSF Industry Documents Library is to "identify, collect, curate, preserve, and make freely accessible internal documents created by industries and their partners which have an impact on public health, for the benefit and use of researchers, clinicians, educators, students, policymakers, media, and the general public at UCSF and internationally".

Collections 
The IDL includes the following archives: 
 the Truth Tobacco Industry Documents
 the Drug Industry Documents Archive 
 the Food Industry Documents Archive 
 the Chemical Industry Documents Archive 
the Fossil Fuel Industry Document Archive

References

External links 
 Official site

Tobacco industry
Pharmaceutical industry
Chemical industry
Sugar
Business and industry archives
American digital libraries
University of California, San Francisco